The Mind Readers is a crime novel by Margery Allingham, first published in 1965, in the United Kingdom by Chatto & Windus, London. It is the eighteenth novel in the Albert Campion series.

Plot introduction
Canon Avril is looking forward to hosting Albert Campion and his wife Lady Amanda for half-term, with their nephew Edward, and his cousin Sam. But strange things are happening at the electronics establishment on a remote island on the east coast where Sam's father works, and when the boys arrive at Liverpool Street Station an attempt is made to kidnap them. Then Edward goes missing, and Campion and DS Charles Luke find themselves caught up in a mystery, unexpectedly helped by a certain Thomas T. Knapp.....

References 
 Margery Allingham, The Mind Readers, (London: Chatto & Windus, 1965)

External links 
An Allingham bibliography, with dates and publishers, from the UK Margery Allingham Society
 A page about the book from the Margery Allingham Archive

1965 British novels
Novels by Margery Allingham
Chatto & Windus books